Kathy Jordan and Martina Navratilova were the defending champions but only Navratilova competed that year with Lori McNeil.

McNeil and Navratilova lost in the final 6–7, 6–2, 6–4 against Katrina Adams and Zina Garrison.

Seeds
Champion seeds are indicated in bold text while text in italics indicates the round in which those seeds were eliminated.

 Lori McNeil /  Martina Navratilova (final)
 Katrina Adams /  Zina Garrison (champions)
 Rosalyn Fairbank /  Candy Reynolds (quarterfinals)
 Penny Barg /  Mercedes Paz (semifinals)

Draw

References
 1988 Virginia Slims of Houston Doubles Draw

1988,Doubles
1988 WTA Tour
1988 in sports in Texas
1988 in American tennis